"Baby" is a song by American rapper Fabolous featuring Mike Shorey. It is the second single from Fabolous' third studio album Real Talk. The song reached #17 in the Hot Rap Tracks chart and #22 in the Billboard Hot R&B/Hip-Hop Singles & Tracks chart, although only managed #71 in the Billboard 100. The song failed to make a big impact on the UK Chart, where it missed out on the top 40 following its release. It contains a replay, not a sample of "I Can't Help It" by Michael Jackson, lyrics from "2 Bad" by Michael Jackson and of "Breakadawn" by De La Soul. (Replayed by J remy of Orange Factory Music) The chorus also samples "Big Poppa" by The Notorious B.I.G.  Rev Run makes a cameo appearance at the end of the music video.

Charts

Release history

References

2005 singles
Fabolous songs
Songs written by Fabolous
Songs written by Stevie Wonder
Songs written by Susaye Greene
2004 songs
Atlantic Records singles